Keith Edwin Guthrie (born August 17, 1961) is a former American football defensive tackle. He played for the San Diego Chargers in 1984.

References

1961 births
Living people
American football defensive tackles
Texas A&M Aggies football players
San Diego Chargers players